Rabbit of Seville is a Warner Bros. Looney Tunes theatrical cartoon short released on December 16, 1950. It was directed by Chuck Jones and written by Michael Maltese, and features Bugs Bunny and Elmer Fudd. The nonstop slapstick humor in the short is paced musically around the overture to Italian composer Gioachino Rossini's 1816 opera buffa The Barber of Seville. In 1994, Rabbit of Seville ranked number 12 in a list of "The 50 Greatest Cartoons" released in North America during the 20th century, a ranking compiled from votes cast by 1,000 artists, producers, directors, voice actors, and other professionals in the field of animation.

Plot
The cartoon opens with people filing in to see The Barber of Seville in an amphitheatre. Unnoticed from up on the hills in the back of the theatre, gunfire flashes are seen and shots are heard. Bugs Bunny and a hunter chasing him, who is soon revealed to be Elmer Fudd, run down from the hills to the theater's open backstage door. Bugs runs through the door and slams it shut to hide himself behind it as Elmer enters, and looking for Bugs, stalks unknowingly onstage behind the curtain. His back to the curtain, Elmer does not notice it rise, nor does he hear the resulting applause from the audience, when Bugs, using a carrot to do so, flicks the switch to raise the curtain.  The conductor, after a brief, confused glance at his watch, shrugs and starts the orchestra, making Elmer flinch and turn, wide-eyed, toward the audience. Bugs, dressed as a barber, steps out into the doorway of a staged barber shop set before a scenic town backdrop and starts singing as he speaks. He grabs Elmer, trying to sneak offstage, and gives him a shave, fiercely slashing the razor and rendering him "nice and clean, although your face looks like it might have gone through a machine."

Elmer retrieves his hunter's hat and rifle and starts the chase again, singing his only line "Oh, wait till I get that wabbit!", but is stopped by Bugs, dressed as a temptress, singing, "What would you want with a wabbit? Can't you see that I'm much sweeter? I'm your little señoriter. You are my type of guy, let me straighten your tie, and I shall dance for you." (no dialogue is heard again from this point on until the end). While Bugs sings to him, Elmer becomes smitten with Bugs' temptress disguise, and Bugs ties up the rifle into a bow (when he 'straightens' Elmer's supposed tie); now, dancing and using scissors like castanets, he snips off Elmer's pants' suspender buttons, and Elmer is thoroughly embarrassed when he realizes his pants have fallen down; he sees through Bugs' disguise, none withstanding that Bugs deliberately taunts Elmer with sticking his tail up at him, and shoots the tied-up rifle, resulting in him being blown back into the barber's chair. Bugs has another go on Elmer's scalp, beginning by giving his head a massage using both hands and feet, and then turning his head into a fruit salad bowl (complete with whipped cream and a cherry on top). Angered, Elmer chases after Bugs with a razor, but Bugs becomes a snake charmer, actually charming an electric shaver to chase Elmer. Elmer eventually disables the shaver with a shotgun blast and chases Bugs back to the barber's chairs. Bugs and Elmer each get on a chair that they raise to dizzying heights, Elmer shooting at Bugs all the way. Bugs cuts loose a stage sandbag which stuns Elmer as it lands in his lap, causing the chair to spin down back into the barbershop. Spirally sliding one-handed down the pole of the other chair, Bugs receives the traditional barber's gratuity from the dazed Elmer, then throws him in a revolving door to further daze him and, as Elmer staggers back out, waltzes him back into the barber's chair.

Before Bugs' third go-round with the scalp, he opens one of Elmer's boots with a can opener and does a pedicure using hedge clippers, file, and red paint. That is followed by pouring hair restorer on Elmer's face, then shaving off the resulting beard with a miniature mower and, finally, a masque for the face using 'beauty clay', which Bugs handles like cement. Then it's back to the scalp as Bugs thoroughly massages it with his hands and ears after adding hair tonic, then "Figaro Fertilizer", causing hair to grow which sprouts into flowers. As a result, a short arms race occurs during which Bugs and Elmer take turns pursuing each other back and forth across the stage, with increasingly bigger weapons (axes, guns, cannons). Finally, Bugs ends the chase by offering flowers, chocolates, and a ring to Elmer, who absentmindedly ducks offstage and returns as a blushing bride. Bugs dresses as a groom, and the tune briefly switches to the final part of the "Wedding March" by Mendelssohn as the two are "wed" by a priest; the performance concludes with Bugs racing his "bride" up a very long flight of stairs and, when they reach a false house front door at the top, Bugs picks Elmer up as if to carry him over the threshold. Instead he drops him head-first into a large wedding cake below, labeled, "The Marriage of Figaro". Bugs then looks at the camera, smirks, and breaking the fourth wall, says as he eats a carrot, in the same manner in which he delivers his catchphrase, "Eh, next?"

Production
In a plotline reminiscent of Stage Door Cartoon, Rabbit of Seville features Bugs Bunny being chased by Elmer Fudd into the stage door of the Hollywood Bowl, whereupon Bugs tricks Elmer into going onstage, and participating in a break-neck operatic production of their chase punctuated with gags and accompanied by musical arrangements by Carl Stalling, focusing on Rossini's overture to the 1816 opera The Barber of Seville.

In Stalling's arrangement, the overture's basic structure is kept relatively intact; some repeated passages are removed and the overall piece is conducted at a faster tempo to accommodate the cartoon's standard running length. In a short sequence where Bugs' scalp massage follows a piano solo, the character's hands are shown with five fingers, instead of his usual four, so the character can believably follow the tune.  In 1994 it was voted No. 12 of the 50 Greatest Cartoons of all time by members of the animation field.

The "Barber of Seville" poster that appears at the start of the film features three names: Eduardo Selzeri, Michele Maltese, and Carlo Jonzi, which are Italianized versions of the names of the producer (Edward Selzer), writer (Michael Maltese), and director (Chuck Jones) of the film.

Reception
Animation historian Greg Ford writes, "Chuck Jones' two most beloved operatic extravaganzas starring Bugs Bunny, What's Opera, Doc? (1957) and Rabbit of Seville, veer down somewhat different paths stylistically. What's Opera, Doc? relies on a more removed, high-concept graphic sense and the shock effect of Maurice Noble's splendidly expressionistic set design. The humor of Rabbit of Seville, staged against Robert Gribbroek's straightforward backgrounds, depends more exclusively on the cartoon's intense synchronization whereby every bit of slapstick action, mini-movement by mini-movement, links to the accompanying Rossini score. In Seville, Jones was really harking back to an older Warner Bros. legacy: director Friz Freleng's Rhapsody in Rivets (1941) and Pigs in a Polka (1943), perhaps the two most insistently "Mickey Moused" (perfectly synched) musical cartoons ever made."

Home media
Rabbit of Seville is available, uncut and digitally remastered, on disc 1 of Looney Tunes Golden Collection: Volume 1, disc 1 of The Essential Bugs Bunny, on disc 1 of Looney Tunes Platinum Collection: Volume 1, and on disc 2 of Bugs Bunny 80th Anniversary Collection.

References
Lawrence Van Gelder, With That Wascally Wabbit, That's Not All, Folks, NY Times,  October 22, 1999
Richard Freedman, What's Opera, Doc?, Adante Magazine, March 2002

Notes

External links

1950 films
1950 animated films
1950 short films
1950s Warner Bros. animated short films
Short films directed by Chuck Jones
Looney Tunes shorts
Films based on The Barber of Seville
1950 musical comedy films
American musical comedy films
Films scored by Carl Stalling
Bugs Bunny films
Elmer Fudd films
Films with screenplays by Michael Maltese
1950s English-language films
Films set in a theatre